Asia Honour Paper Industries (M) Sdn. Bhd, formerly known as Malaysian Newsprint Industries Sdn Bhd (abbreviated MNI), is a pulp and paper company based in Petaling Jaya, Malaysia. It operates a single pulp mill and paper mill in Mentakab, which produces an annual 280,000 tonnes of newsprint sourced entirely from deinked pulp from recycled paper.

History 
The company was established in 1996, in an attempt to allow Malaysian and Singaporean newspaper to source their newsprint without having to import. The company was established as a joint venture between the New Zealand newsprint manufacturer Fletcher Challenge Paper, the Malaysian family conglomerate the Hong Leong Group, each with 33.65 percent of the shares, with the remainder split between the New Straits Times Press and Rimbunan Hijau. The mill opened in April 1999, having cost 500 million United States dollars. Fletcher Challenge Paper was bought by Norske Skog in 2000, who took over the ownership stake in MNI.

References

Pulp and paper companies of Malaysia
Companies based in Petaling Jaya
1996 establishments in Malaysia
Fletcher Challenge
Media Prima
Norske Skog
Privately held companies of Malaysia